Planktomarina is a heterotrophic genus of bacteria from the family of Rhodobacteraceae with one known species (Planktomarina temperata). Planktomarina temperata has been isolated from seawater from the Wadden Sea in Germany.

References

Rhodobacteraceae
Bacteria genera
Monotypic bacteria genera